Jacobinas are Filipino biscuits. They are distinctively cubical in shape, resembling a thicker galletas de patatas. The biscuit was first produced by the Noceda Bakery in 1947 by Paterno Noceda, and remains a registered trademark in the Philippines. The biscuits are sold by the Noceda bakery in the Philippines and by the Jacobina corporation in the United States and other Asian countries. Jacobinas are traditionally eaten paired with coffee for breakfast.

See also
Broas
Galletas de patatas
Galletas del Carmen
Roscas

References 

Philippine cuisine
Biscuits